is a Japanese figure skater. He placed 22nd at the 2007 World Junior Championships and won a bronze medal at an ISU Junior Grand Prix event in Romania.

Programs

Competitive highlights

References

External links

 

1988 births
Living people
Japanese male single skaters
Sportspeople from Tokyo